Willie Bert Fears Jr. (born June 4, 1964) is a former American professional football player who was a defensive lineman in the National Football League (NFL) and the World League of American Football (WLAF). He played for the Cincinnati Bengals and Minnesota Vikings of the NFL, and the San Antonio Riders of the WLAF. Fears played collegiately at Northwestern State University. Fears also played for the Cleveland Thunderbolts, the Tampa Bay Storm and the Nashville Kats of the Arena Football League. He was named First-team All-Arena in 1993.

References

External links
Just Sports Stats

1964 births
Living people
American football defensive ends
American football defensive tackles
Canadian football defensive linemen
African-American players of American football
African-American players of Canadian football
Cleveland Thunderbolts players
Cincinnati Bengals players
Tampa Bay Storm players
Nashville Kats players
Holmes Bulldogs football players
Minnesota Vikings players
Northwestern State Demons football players
Ottawa Rough Riders players
Players of American football from Chicago
Players of Canadian football from Chicago
Sacramento Gold Miners players
San Antonio Riders players
San Antonio Texans players
Toronto Argonauts players
Winnipeg Blue Bombers players
National Football League replacement players
21st-century African-American people
20th-century African-American sportspeople